Johnny Tillotson (born April 20, 1938) is an American singer-songwriter. He enjoyed his greatest success in the early 1960s, when he scored nine top-ten hits on the pop, country, and adult contemporary Billboard charts, including "Poetry in Motion" and the self-penned "It Keeps Right On a-Hurtin'" and "Without You".

Biography
Tillotson is the son of Doris and Jack Tillotson, who owned a small service station on the corner of 6th and Pearl in Jacksonville, and acted as the station's mechanic. At the age of nine, Johnny was sent to Palatka, Florida, to take care of his grandmother. He returned to Jacksonville each summer to be with his parents when his brother Dan would go to his grandmother. Johnny began to perform at local functions as a child, and by the time he was at Palatka Senior High School he had developed a reputation as a talented singer. Tillotson became a semi-regular on WJXT's McDuff Hayride, hosted by Toby Dowdy, and soon landed his own show on WFGA-TV. In 1957, while Tillotson was studying at the University of Florida, local disc jockey Bob Norris sent a tape of Johnny's singing to the Pet Milk talent contest, and he was chosen as one of six national finalists. This gave Johnny the opportunity to perform in Nashville, Tennessee, on WSM the Grand Ole Opry, which led Lee Rosenberg, a Nashville publisher, to take a tape to Archie Bleyer, owner of the independent Cadence Records. Bleyer signed Tillotson to a three-year contract, and issued his first single, "Dreamy Eyes" / "Well I'm Your Man" in September 1958. Both songs were written by Tillotson, and both made the Billboard Hot 100, "Dreamy Eyes" peaking at No. 63. After graduating in 1959 with a bachelor's degree in journalism and communications, Tillotson moved to New York City to pursue his music career.

From late 1959, a succession of singles – "True True Happiness", "Why Do I Love You So", and a double-sided single covering the R&B hits "Earth Angel" and "Pledging My Love" – all reached the bottom half of the Hot 100.  His biggest success came with his sixth single, the up-tempo "Poetry in Motion", written by Paul Kaufman and Mike Anthony, and recorded in Nashville with session musicians including saxophonist Boots Randolph and pianist Floyd Cramer. Released in September 1960, it went to No. 2 on the Hot 100 in the US, and No. 1 on the UK's Record Retailer chart in January 1961. It sold over one million copies, and was awarded a gold disc by the RIAA. On Bleyer's advice, Tillotson focused on his recording career, also appearing on television and being featured as a teen idol in magazines. His follow-up record, "Jimmy's Girl", reached No. 25 in the US charts and No. 43 in the UK; after that, "Without You" returned him to the US Top Ten but failed to make the UK Singles Chart. He toured widely with Dick Clark's Cavalcade of Stars.

Early in 1962, Tillotson recorded a song he wrote, "It Keeps Right on A-Hurtin'", inspired by the terminal illness of his father. It became one of his biggest hits, reaching No. 3 in the US pop chart, and was the first of his records to make the country music chart where it peaked at No. 4. It earned his first Grammy nomination for him, for Best Country & Western Recording, and was covered by over 100 performers including Elvis Presley and Billy Joe Royal, whose version was a country hit in 1988. Tillotson then recorded an album, It Keeps Right on A-Hurtin''', on which he covered country standards including Hank Locklin's "Send Me the Pillow You Dream On" and Hank Williams' "I Can't Help It (If I'm Still in Love with You)," which also became hit singles.  He continued to record country-flavored and pop songs in 1963, and "You Can Never Stop Me Loving You" and the follow-up, the Willie Nelson song "Funny How Time Slips Away", both made the Hot 100.

With the demise of the Cadence label, he formed a production company and moved to MGM Records, starting with his version of the recent country charted No. 1 song by Ernest Ashworth, "Talk Back Trembling Lips",  reached No. 7 in January 1964 on Billboards Hot 100. He earned his second Grammy nomination for "Heartaches by the Number", nominated for Best Vocal Performance of 1965, which reached No. 4 on the Easy Listening chart. He also sang the theme song for the 1965 Sally Field television comedy Gidget. While his fortunes waned with changing musical tastes in the late 1960s, he continued to record before moving to California in 1968. Besides concert and recording he appeared in several films. He appeared in the 1963 British music film Just for Fun; 1966 camp comedy The Fat Spy starring Jayne Mansfield; the Japanese movie Namida Kun Sayonara, after his Japanese hit of the same name; and the 1976 made-for-TV film The Call of the Wild.

In the 1970s, he recorded for the Amos, Buddah, Columbia, and United Artists labels. He appeared in concert, appearing in theaters, at State Fairs and Festivals, and in major hotels in Las Vegas and elsewhere.

In 1984, he charted briefly on Billboards Hot Country Singles chart with "Lay Back in the Arms of Someone" on Reward Records, and it was during the 80s that his hits in South East Asia had him appear in Thailand, Singapore, Malaysia, Australia, and New Zealand on a regular basis with tours in Japan and Hong Kong.  In 1990, he signed with Atlantic Records and released "Bim Bam Boom", which received significant airplay on Country music stations.

On Sunday, May 19, 1991, his 22-year-old daughter Kelli, who was a model and lived in Encinitas, died in a traffic accident in Parker, Arizona.

In the 1990s, Tillotson recorded several Christmas songs with Freddy Cannon and Brian Hyland for the Children's Miracle Network, produced by Michael Lloyd. He also recorded with Tommy Roe and Brian Hyland, again for Michael Lloyd for Rudolph the Red-Nosed Reindeer: The Movie'' (1998), "We Can Make It".

After a decade-long absence, in 2010 Tillotson released a single titled "Not Enough," a tribute to the military, police, fire, and all uniformed personnel of the United States.

On March 23, 2011, Tillotson was inducted into the Florida Artists Hall of Fame, which is the highest honor that the State of Florida bestows on an artist. Their plaques are on permanent display in the Florida State Capitol.

Recognition
2014 : Inducted into the America's Pop Music Hall of Fame
2014 : BrandLaureate International Legendary Award
2011 : Inductee into the Florida Artists Hall of Fame
2008 : Inductee into the Hit Parade Hall of Fame
2006 : Alumnus of Distinction College of Journalism and Communications University of Florida Gainesville

Discography

Albums

Compilations

Singles

References

External links
 http://www.johnnytillotson.com/ Johnny Tillotson official website
Johnny Tillotson Interview NAMM Oral History Library (2011)

1939 births
Living people
Musicians from Jacksonville, Florida
Country musicians from Florida
American country singer-songwriters
American male singer-songwriters
American male pop singers
Singer-songwriters from Florida
MGM Records artists
Apex Records artists
People from Palatka, Florida
University of Florida alumni
Cadence Records artists